Ivan Lindgren (25 September 1905 – 19 August 1989) was a Swedish cross-country skier. He competed in the men's 18 kilometre event at the 1936 Winter Olympics.

Cross-country skiing results

Olympic Games

References

External links
 

1905 births
1989 deaths
Swedish male cross-country skiers
Olympic cross-country skiers of Sweden
Cross-country skiers at the 1936 Winter Olympics
People from Lycksele Municipality